John Marshall Allen (October 27, 1890 – September 24, 1967) was a professional baseball player whose career spanned three seasons, including one in Major League Baseball with the Baltimore Terrapins (1914). He played the pitcher position. Allen played one game in the majors and gave-up four runs, all earned. Allen also played in the minor leagues with the Class-C Lynchburg Shoemakers (1912) and the Class-D Hagerstown Terriers (1917). In the minors, Allen compiled a record of 6–8 in 16 games. He also managed one season in 1945 with the Greensboro Patriots. Allen served in World War I.

Professional career
Allen began his professional baseball career in 1912 with the Class-C Lynchburg Shoemakers of the Virginia League. With the Shoemakers, Allen compiled a record 2–3 in 44 innings pitched. In 1914, Allen joined the Baltimore Terrapins. On June 2, 1914, Allen played his only Major League Baseball game. He pitched two innings and gave-up two hits, four runs (all earned) and two walks. Allen also struck out two. In Robert Peyton Wiggins's book The Federal League of Base Ball Clubs, he states that Allen "deserted" the Terrapins to play with the minor league Montreal Royals of the International League. However, the move backfired when Allen was not signed by the Royals. According to the Society for American Baseball Research, Allen served in Europe during World War I. Allen joined the Class-D Hagerstown Terriers of the Blue Ridge League in 1917. He went 4–5 in 10 games. Allen also batted .135 with five hits, one double and one home run in 37 at-bats. In 1945, Allen became the manager of the minor league Greensboro Patriots. It was Allen's only season as a manager.

Personal
Allen was born on October 27, 1890, in Berkeley Springs, West Virginia. He died on September 24, 1967, in Hagerstown, Maryland and was buried at Rose Hill Cemetery in Hagerstown.

References
General references

Inline citations

External links

1890 births
1967 deaths
People from Bath (Berkeley Springs), West Virginia
Baseball players from West Virginia
Major League Baseball pitchers
United States Army personnel of World War I
Hagerstown Terriers players
Baltimore Terrapins players
Lynchburg Shoemakers players
Minor league baseball managers
Burials at Rose Hill Cemetery (Hagerstown, Maryland)